The International Journal of Civil Engineering is a peer-reviewed scientific journal published by Springer Science+Business Media on behalf of the Iranian Society of Civil Engineering and the Iran University of Science and Technology. It covers theoretical and research related to all aspects of civil engineering.

Abstracting and indexing
The journal is abstracted and indexed in Scopus, Islamic World Science Citation Database, and the Science Citation Index Expanded. According to the Journal Citation Reports, the journal has a 2020 impact factor of 2.081.

References

External links

English-language journals
Civil engineering journals
Publications established in 2003
Iran University of Science and Technology
Hybrid open access journals
Springer Science+Business Media academic journals